is a Japanese politician of the Democratic Party of Japan, a member of House of Representatives in the Diet (national legislature). A native of Izumisano, Osaka and graduate of the University of Tokyo he was elected for the first time in 2003.

References

External links 
  in Japanese

1968 births
Living people
People from Izumisano
University of Tokyo alumni
Members of the House of Representatives (Japan)
Democratic Party of Japan politicians
21st-century Japanese politicians